Putikhali Union is a Union Parishad under Morrelganj Upazila of Bagerhat District in the division of Khulna, Bangladesh. It has an area of 22.35 km2 (8.63 sq mi) and a population of 22,666.

References

Unions of Bagerhat District
Unions of Khulna Division
Unions of Morrelganj Upazila